Ralph Waldo Emerson Donges (May 5, 1875 – September 21, 1974), known as Ralph W. E. Donges, was judge in New Jersey who served as Justice of the New Jersey Supreme Court from 1930 to 1948.

Biography
Donges was born on May 5, 1875, in Donaldson, Frailey Township, Schuylkill County, Pennsylvania on May 5, 1875, to John Washington Donges (1844-1931) and Rose Marguerite Ranaud (1845-1911).

Donges was Democrat and delegate to Democratic National Convention from New Jersey, 1916. He was colonel in the U.S. Army during World War I. He was Episcopalian and a member of the American Bar Association, the Freemasons, Loyal Order of Moose, and Benevolent and Protective Order of Elks.

He was a circuit judge in New Jersey from 1920 to 1930 and an Associate Justice of New Jersey Supreme Court from 1930 to 1948. After the Constitution of New Jersey was re-written in 1947, he was appointed to serve the New Jersey Superior Court from 1948 to 1951.

He resided in Camden and Collngswood in Camden County, New Jersey.

He died on September 21, 1974, at the age of 99 in Oaklyn, New Jersey and is entombed in a mausoleum at Harleigh Cemetery, Camden.

Legacy
The Camden County Bar Association awards a college scholarship in his honor.

See also
List of justices of the Supreme Court of New Jersey
New Jersey Court of Errors and Appeals
Courts of New Jersey

References

1875 births
1974 deaths
Justices of the Supreme Court of New Jersey
People from Schuylkill County, Pennsylvania
Politicians from Camden, New Jersey
People from Collingswood, New Jersey
People from Oaklyn, New Jersey
Burials at Harleigh Cemetery, Camden